The 1952 South Sydney DRLFC season was the 45th in the club's history. They competed in the New South Wales Rugby Football League's 1952 Premiership, and lost the grand final against the Western Suburbs.

Ladder

Results

References

South Sydney Rabbitohs seasons
South Sydney season